The Olympique Lyonnais–AS Saint-Étienne rivalry, is a football rivalry between French clubs Olympique Lyonnais and AS Saint-Étienne, with matches between them referred to as the Derby Rhône-Alpes, Derby Rhônealpin or simply Le Derby. Both clubs are located in the region of Auvergne-Rhône-Alpes. The term Derby du Rhône is sometimes used by French media, despite the city of Saint-Étienne not being located along the Rhône River nor in the Rhône département.

Background
The two clubs first met in 1951 and, due to the clubs' close proximity, being separated by only , a hotly contested rivalry developed. The derby is cited as one of the high-points of the Ligue 1 season and, like other major rivalries, extends outside of the pitch. The rivalry is locally considered a symbolic challenge between the two cities, as the city of Lyon is considered white collar while its counterpart Saint-Étienne is viewed by the locals as more blue collar.

During the 20th century, Saint-Étienne was the most successful club in French football winning ten league titles between 1957 and 1981, a record that still stands today. During that span, the club also won six Coupe de France titles and performed well at European level. However, the club's performance declined in the 1980s and it even suffered a relegation to the second division in 1984, causing its stranglehold on the national and regional consciousness to weaken. Lyon began a similar ascension into French football at the beginning of the new millennium when the club won their first-ever Ligue 1 championship in 2002. The initial title started a national record-setting streak of seven successive titles.

Currently, both clubs are among the best-supported in Ligue 1, and each has participated in European competition in recent years.

Head-to-head record
As of match played 21 January 2022

Switching clubs
Due to the clubs' ongoing rivalry, few players have played for both Lyon and Saint-Étienne. Since the two clubs first contested each other in 1951, only 27 players have played for both Lyon and Saint-Étienne and only 13 players have transferred directly from Lyon to Saint-Étienne and vice versa. The first player to "commit" the offense was Antoine Rodriguez in 1951, when after having a nine-year spell at Saint-Étienne, he moved to Lyon, where he spent only one season. Other notable players who made the switch were Aimé Jacquet who, after having a successful 13-year career with Saint-Étienne, departed the club for Lyon, where he spent three seasons. Jacquet later went on to manage Lyon and coached the team to the 1973 Coupe de France Final. Similarly, striker Bernard Lacombe established himself as one of Lyon's all-time leading goalscorers before leaving the club for Saint-Étienne in 1978 where he was often booed and jeered, which led to the player departing the club for Bordeaux after one season. The other players who transferred directly between clubs are François Lemasson, Alain Moizan, André Calligaris, Romarin Billong, Jean-Luc Sassus, Christopher Deguerville, Grégory Coupet, Franck Priou, Lamine Diatta and Bafétimbi Gomis. Steed Malbranque, a product of Lyon youth system and a former Lyon first-team regular, signed for Saint-Étienne from Sunderland, but then resigned after one month, allegedly calling quit to his career. He surprisingly signed for Lyon a few months later.

OL, then ASSE

ASSE, then OL

References

External links
  AS Saint-Étienne Official Site
  Olympique Lyonnais Official Site

French football derbies
AS Saint-Étienne
Olympique Lyonnais
Football in Auvergne-Rhône-Alpes
1951 establishments in France
Recurring sporting events established in 1951